Deendar Anjuman is an  Islamic religious organization founded in Hyderabad, India. The organisation believes in Sufism. It maintains that the founding principles of Islam and Lingayatism are similar. The group was banned India in 2000.

History

The Deendar Anjuman was founded in 1924 by Siddique Deendar (who is also known as Syed Siddique Hussain) in Gadag town of Karnataka. he claimed to be the reincarnation of Channa Basaveshwara, a Lingayat saint from 12th century. He spent his life in spreading the message of unity and harmony. He toured most of south India, speaking about the similarities in Islam and Lingayatism. Some believed he converted some Hindus to Islam.

Ban 
Deendar Anjuman was banned in May 2001.  The group's founder Siddique is reported to have hated the British colonial government in 1934 jailed Siddiqui and 18 of his followers for indulging in inflammatory speeches and writings. 

In October 2007 the ban was extended and the group declared an unlawful. for "indulging in activities which are pre-judicial to the security of the country having the potential to disturb peace and communal harmony and to disrupt the secular fabric of the country". 

In 2008, Capital punishment was awarded to 11 people and life sentence to 12 others by a local court. The prime accused in the case, Zia-ul-Hassan was the son of Syed Siddique Hussain, the founder of Deendar Anjuman. Zia-ul-Hassan had migrated to Pakistan and used to visit Hyderabad during his father's death anniversary.  Deendar Channabasaveshwara Anjuman, founded in the 1920s. The conspiracy was hatched in October 1999 in Hyderabad, during the death anniversary of its founder Hajrath Moulana Siddiqui.

See also
 Darsgah-Jihad-O-Shahadat

References

External links
Court confirms conviction of main accused, acquits 17 in van blast case

1924 establishments in India
Organisations designated as terrorist by India
Rebel groups in Pakistan
Organisations based in Hyderabad, India
Islamic organisations based in India
Islamic terrorism in India